Cieślik is a Polish surname. Notable people with the surname include:

Gerard Cieślik (1927–2013), Polish footballer
Marzena Cieślik (born 1981), Polish model and beauty pageant winner
Paweł Cieślik (born 1986), Polish cyclist

Polish-language surnames